Colonel James D. Stevenson (1840–1888) was an executive officer of the U.S. Geological Survey and a self-taught geologist, naturalist and anthropologist.  His geological surveys included Colorado, Idaho, Wyoming and Utah.  Stevenson Island in Wyoming was named after him as a result of his assistance to  Dr. Ferdinand Vandeveer Hayden in the Hayden Geological Survey of 1871.

Stevenson's wife was the American ethnologist Matilda Coxe Stevenson (1849-1915, m. 1872).  She helped James prepare reports, analyses, and catalogs of the collection that were later published in the Bureau of Ethnology Annual Reports, as James disliked writing reports and was described as lacking the creative mind and discipline needed for writing.   Together, the Stevensons formed the first husband-wife team in anthropology.

James Stevenson died due to Rocky Mountain fever. At the time of his death, the couple had been preparing an ethnography of the Zia people of New Mexico.

Some accounts report Stevenson asked to buy the Zia tribe's sacred pot, which was decorated the tribe's Zia symbol, which the tribe declined. The ceremonial pot then disappeared and reappeared in a museum collection. Stevenson's own book, now out of print, apparently referenced the theft. Leslie A. White wrote a book, Zia: The Sun Symbol Pueblo, which also documented the theft of the pottery.

References 

4. White, Leslie A. Zia: The Sun Symbol Pueblo. Albuquerque, N.M. : University of Albuquerque, in collaboration with Calvin Horn Publisher, 1974.
Series:	Indian classics series (Albuquerque, N.M.), 3.; Bulletin (Smithsonian Institution. Bureau of American Ethnology), 184.

External links
 
 

1840 births
1888 deaths
American geologists
United States Geological Survey personnel
American naturalists
American anthropologists